The National emblem of Angola reflects the recent past of the new nation. There is heavy Marxist imagery found on the device (as can be seen when compared with other examples of socialist heraldry), expanded from what is found on the national flag.

In the center is a machete and hoe, representing the revolution through which the nation gained independence and the importance of agricultural workers. Above both emblems is a star, a common symbol in socialist emblems. The star is taken to represent progress. The rising sun is the traditional symbol of a new beginning. These emblems are all enclosed within a circle whose right half is formed by cog-wheel, representing the industrial workers, and whose left half is a half-wreath of maize, coffea and cotton leaves, representing agriculture. At the bottom is an open book that represents education.

The banner at the bottom reads , Portuguese for "Republic of Angola".

Details of the insignia are laid down in Article 163 of the Constitution of Angola.

In 1935, the Portuguese colonies were officially assigned coats of arms that followed a standard design pattern. For Angola, this consisted of a shield parted per pale, with the Portuguese arms without its usual bordure in the dexter (viewer's left) half and in the sinister (viewer's right) half the arms for Angola itself: a golden elephant and a golden zebra on a purpure field. The wavy bars in the base (enté en point) represented Angola's location overseas from metropolitan Portugal.

Historical coats of arms

References

External links
 National emblem/coat of arms of Angola (archived)

National symbols of Angola
Angola
Angola
Angola
Angola
Angola
Angola
Angola
Angola
Angola
Angola
Angola